This is the list of schools which provide secondary education in Croatia.

List of schools by county

Zagreb County
Air Force Technical School Rudolf Perešin, Velika Gorica
Art School Franjo Lučić, Velika Gorica
Economic School Velika Gorica, Velika Gorica
Economic, Trade and Catering School Andrije Hebranga, Samobor
Gymnasium "Antun Gustav Matoš" Samobor, Samobor
Gymnasium Velika Gorica, Velika Gorica
High School Ban Josip Jelačić, Zaprešić
High School Dragutin Stražimir, Sveti Ivan Zelina
High School Vrbovec, Vrbovec
Music School "Ferdo Livadić", Samobor
Secondary School Dugo Selo, Dugo Selo
Secondary School "Ivan Švear" Ivanić Grad, Ivanić Grad
Secondary School Jastrebarsko, Jastrebarsko
Vocational School Samobor, Samobor
Vocation School Velika Gorica, Velika Gorica

Krapina-Zagorje County
Gymnasium Antun Gustav Matoš Zabok, Zabok
High School Bedekovčina, Bedekovčina
High School Konjščina, Konjščina
High School Krapina, Krapina
High School Oroslavlje, Oroslavlje
High School Pregrada, Pregrada
High School Zabok, Zabok
High School Zlatar, Zlatar
Music School Pregrada, Pregrada
School of Arts, Design, Graphic and Apparel Zabok, Zabok

Varaždin County
Agricultural and Veterinary School "Arboretum Opeka", Vinica
Architectural, Natural Science and Mining school, Varaždin
Economy School, Varaždin
Electromechanical-Engineering School, Varaždin
I. Gymnasium Varaždin, Varaždin
First Private Gymnasium, Varaždin
High School Ivanec, Ivanec
High School Maruševec, Maruševec
Private high school with public rights, Varaždin
Private Varaždin Gymnasium Žiger, Varaždin
II. Gymnasium Varaždin, Varaždin
Mechanical engineering and transport school, Varaždin
Medical School, Varaždin
Music School in Varaždin, Varaždin
Vocational School, Varaždin

Sisak-Moslavina County
Economic School Sisak, Sisak
Gymnasium Sisak, Sisak
High School Glina, Glina
High School Ivan Trnski, Hrvatska Kostajnica
High School Novska, Novska
High School Petrinja, Petrinja
High School Tin Ujević Kutina, Kutina
High School Topusko, Topusko
High School Viktorovac, Sisak
Industrial Trades School Sisak, Sisak
Music School Fran Lhotka, Sisak
Music School Novska, Novska
Technical School Kutina, Kutina
Technical School Sisak, Sisak
Vocation School Sisak, Sisak

Karlovac County

Koprivnica-Križevci County
Gymnasium "Fran Galović" Koprivnica

Bjelovar-Bilogora County

Primorje-Gorski Kotar County

Lika-Senj County
 High School Pavao Ritter Vitezović, Senj

Gimnazija Gospic

Virovitica-Podravina County
High School of Engineering
Vocational School
Catholic Classic Gymnasium, Virovitica
Gymnasium Petar Preradović, Virovitica

Požega-Slavonia County

Brod-Posavina County
Classical Gymnasium fra Marijana Lanosovića, Slavonski Brod
Gymnasium Matija Mesić, Slavonski Brod
Gymnasium Matija Antun Reljković, Slavonski Brod

Zadar County

Osijek-Baranja County
 High School Dalj

Šibenik-Knin County

Vukovar-Syrmia County
Agricultural Forestry School Vinkovci, Vinkovci
Economic and Trade School Domac Ivan Vinkovci, Vinkovci
Gymnasium Vinkovci, Vinkovci
Gymnasium Vukovar, Vukovar
Gymnasium Županja, Županja
Health and Veterinary school Dr. Andrija Štampar Vinkovci, Vinkovci
High School Ilok, Ilok
School of Economics Vukovar, Vukovar
School of Music Joseph Runjanin Vinkovci, Vinkovci
Technical School of Nikola Tesla Vukovar, Vukovar
Technical school Ruder Boskovic Vinkovci, Vinkovci
Technical School Županja, Županja
Vocational School Vinkovci, Vinkovci
Vocational School Vukovar, Vukovar
Wood-Technical Technical School Vinkovci, Vinkovci

Split-Dalmatia County
Srednja strukovna škola Blaž Jurjev Trogiranin Trogir
Srednja škola Ivana Lucića Trogir

Istria County

Dubrovnik-Neretva County
Biskupijska klasična gimznazija Ruđer Bošković - Dubrovnik

Dubrovačka privatna gimnazija - Dubrovnik

Ekonomska i trgovačka škola Dubrovnik- Dubrovnik

Medicinska škola - Dubrovnik

Obrtnička škola - Dubrovnik

Gimnazija Metković - Metković

Srednja škola Metković - Metković

Srednja poljoprivredna i tehnička škola - Opuzen

Srednja škola Blato - Korčula

Srednja škola fra Andrije Kačića Miošića - Ploče

Turistička i ugostiteljska škola - Dubrovnik

Srednja škola Petra Šegedina - Korčula

Srednjaškola - Vela Luka

Umjetnička škola Luke Sorkočevića - Dubrovnik

Međimurje County
Economy school Čakovec, Čakovec
Gymnasium of Josip Slavenski Čakovec, Čakovec
Economic and trading school Čakovec, Čakovec                     
Construction school Čakovec, Čakovec
High school Prelog, Prelog
Technical school Čakovec, Čakovec
High school Čakovec, 
Čakovec

City of Zagreb

See also
Education in Croatia
List of institutions of higher education in Croatia
List of schools in Croatia

Education in Croatia

Croatia education-related lists
Schools, high
Schools, high